CGI.pm is a large and once widely used Perl module for programming Common Gateway Interface (CGI) web applications, providing a consistent API for receiving and processing user input. There are also functions for producing HTML or XHTML output, but these are now unmaintained and are to be avoided. CGI.pm was a core Perl module but has been removed as of v5.22 of Perl. The module was written by Lincoln Stein and is now maintained by Lee Johnson.

Examples 
Here is a simple CGI page, written in Perl using CGI.pm (in object-oriented style):

#!/usr/bin/env perl

use strict;
use warnings;

use CGI;

my $cgi = CGI->new;

print $cgi->header('text/html');

print << "EndOfHTML";
<!DOCTYPE html>
<html>
    <head>
        <title>A Simple CGI Page</title>
        <meta http-equiv="Content-Type" content="text/html; charset=iso-8859-1" />
    </head>
    <body>
        <h1>A Simple CGI Page</h1>
        <form method="post" enctype="multipart/form-data">
            Name: <input type="text" name="name"  /><br />
            Age: <input type="text" name="age"  /><p>
            <input type="submit" name="Submit!" value="Submit!" />
        </form>
        <hr />
EndOfHTML

if ( my $name = $cgi->param('name') ) {
    print "Your name is $name.<br />";
}

if ( my $age = $cgi->param('age') ) {
    print "You are $age years old.";
}

print '</body></html>';

This would print a very simple webform, asking for your name and age, and after having been submitted, redisplaying the form with the name and age displayed below it.

#!perl

use strict;
use warnings;
use CGI qw/ :standard /;

print header('text/html');

# ... HTML output same as above example

if ( my $name = param('name') ) {
    print "Your name is $name.<br />";
}

if ( my $age = param('age') ) {
    print "You are $age years old.";
}

print '</body></html>';

Note: in many examples , short for query, is used to store a CGI object.

See also
mod_perl

References

External links
CGI.pm – at the CPAN

Perl modules